Carl Ecke was a German piano brand from Prussia during the 19th and 20th century. The production started in Posen (Poznan), in 1843. At first only grand pianos were made by this company, but in 1870 it started making upright pianos as well. The company was then expanded and in 1873 moved to Berlin, and later also to Dresden.

The signature on the pianos changed over the years:

 Carl Ecke, Posen (until about 1890)
 Carl Ecke, Berlin & Posen (Berlin u. Posen) (in 1870s, 1890s, and about 1900)
 Carl Ecke, Berlin, Dresden, Posen (in 1890s, also about 1908)
 Carl Ecke, Berlin – Dresden (after 1895)
 Carl Ecke, Berlin (in 1885, after 1905, and regularly in the 1930s).

References

Piano manufacturing companies of Germany
Manufacturing companies established in 1843
1843 establishments in Poland
German companies established in 1843
Musical instrument manufacturing companies based in Berlin
Companies based in Poznań
Companies of Prussia